Latonia may refer to:
 Latonia (frog), a genus of frogs in the family Alytidae
 Latonia, Covington, a place in Kentucky
 Latonia Blackman (born 1982), Barbadian netball player
 Latonia Moore (born 1979), American opera singer

See also
 Tonia (disambiguation)
 LaTonya (name)
 LaTanya (name)
 Latania, a palm tree
 La Tania, Savoie, France; a ski resort
Latonia Derby
Latonia Lakes, Kentucky
Latonia Race Track
LaTonya, given name